Finalists for Best Documentary (Short Subject) are selected by the Documentary Branch based on a preliminary ballot. A second preferential ballot determines the five nominees. These are the additional films that were shortlisted.

List of shortlisted films

See also
Submissions for Best Documentary Feature

References

Academy Awards lists
Lists of documentary films